Carol Haidu (born 3 June 1942) is a Romanian former footballer who played as a goalkeeper.

Club career
Carol Haidu was born on 3 June 1942 in Râșnov, Romania under the name of Karol Haydu, but the communist authorities made him change it to Carol Haidu, in order to "sound more Romanian". He started to play junior level football in 1958 at Luceafarul Brașov, afterwards moving at Steagul Roșu Brașov where he made his Divizia A debut on 1 April 1962 under coach Silviu Ploeșteanu in a 3–1 away loss against Dinamo Pitești. He went to play for Steaua București in 1964, a team with whom he won the 1967–68 Divizia A title in which coach Ștefan Kovács used him in 20 matches, also helping the club win five Cupa României. During his period spent with The Military Men he also played 9 games (including one appearance in the Inter-Cities Fairs Cup) in European competitions, taking part in the 1971–72 European Cup Winners' Cup campaign, playing three games as the team reached the quarter-finals by eliminating Hibernians and Barcelona, being eliminated after 1–1 on aggregate on the away goal rule by Bayern Munich. Haidu's last Divizia A appearance took place on 9 December 1973, playing for Steaua in a 1–0 away loss against SC Bacău, having a total of 158 appearances in the competition. After he retired from football, he had a period when he suffered from poverty, not having a place to sleep. Carol Haidu died on 11 July 2022 at age 80.

International career
Carol Haidu played five games at international level for Romania, including three at the 1966 World Cup qualifiers. He received goals in only one game, a 2–1 loss against Portugal, with both goals being scored by Eusébio.

Honours
Steaua București
Divizia A: 1967–68
Cupa României: 1965–66, 1966–67, 1968–69, 1969–70, 1970–71

References

External links

Carol Haidu at Labtof.ro

1942 births
2022 deaths
Romanian footballers
Romania international footballers
Association football goalkeepers
Liga I players
FC Brașov (1936) players
FC Steaua București players
People from Râșnov